The SWALEC Wales Challenge was a golf tournament on the Challenge Tour. It run annually from 2003 to 2010.

Winners

Notes

External links
Coverage on the Challenge Tour's official site

Former Challenge Tour events
Golf tournaments in Wales